Vishnyakov and Vishnyakova (feminine) is a common Russian surname meaning cherry.

People with this surname include:
 Albert Vishnyakov (b. 1983), a Russian ice hockey player
 Aleksey Semyonovich Vishnyakov (1859–1919), a Russian industrialist, founder of the Plekhanov University
 Alyaksandr Vishnyakow (b. 1986), a Belarusian footballer
 Georgy Vishnyakov (1871–unknown), Russian sports shooter, competitor in the 1912 Summer Olympics
 Ivan Vishnyakov (1699–1761), a Russian painter 
 Konstantin Vishnyakov (b. 1982), a Russian sprint canoer
  Igor Vishnyakov  , a Russian photographer

References

See also 
 Vishniac (disambiguation)

Russian-language surnames